CUTE-1.7 + APD (Cubical Tokyo Tech Engineering satellite 1.7 plus Avalanche Photodiode) or CO-56 (Cubesat-Oscar-56) or just OSCAR 56 was an amateur radio satellite in the form of a double CubeSat. The satellite used commercial off-the-shelf components extensively, in particular, it used the Hitachi NPD-20JWL PDA as a control computer, and it used a USB hub for sensor communications. At the end of its mission, the satellite was supposed to deploy an electrodynamic tether to help it deorbit. The satellite failed early into its mission, so the electrodynamic tether experiment probably did not happen. It was launched on February 21, 2006 on board a Japanese launcher M-V.

On 16 March 2006, the communication system malfunctioned so that it was transmitting unmodulated carrier wave and unable to communicate. The satellite decayed from orbit on 25 October 2009. A follow-up mission, CUTE-1.7 + APD II, was launched in April 2008 and remains operational.

See also 

 List of CubeSats

References

External links 
 Official homepage
 Summary article
 Telemetry (in Czech)

Amateur radio satellites
Spacecraft which reentered in 2009
Satellites of Japan
Student satellites
Spacecraft launched in 2006
CubeSats
Tokyo Institute of Technology